Agane was a consort Countess of Orléans and died before 862.

9th-century French women
9th-century French people
Medieval French nobility
Year of death unknown
Year of birth unknown